Jenna Joan Tristram (born 28 October 1986) is an Australian soccer player who played for Brisbane Roar in the W-League and for Australia internationally.

International goals

Honours

Club
Brisbane Roar:
 W-League Premiership: 2008–09
 W-League Championship: 2008–09

International
Australia
 AFF Women's Championship: 2008

References 

Australian women's soccer players
Living people
Brisbane Roar FC (A-League Women) players
A-League Women players
1986 births
Australia women's international soccer players
Women's association football forwards
People from Coffs Harbour
Sportswomen from New South Wales
Soccer players from New South Wales